Skåbu is a village in Nord-Fron Municipality in Innlandet county, Norway. Skåbu has about 600 inhabitants. Skåbu Church is located in the village.

Name
The village is named after the old Skåbu farm. The last element is the word  which means 'farm'.

Climate
Due to its high altitude, it has a subarctic climate which is even colder than some arctic areas.

References

Nord-Fron
Villages in Innlandet